Bluford may refer to:

People
Surnamed
 Ferdinand D. Bluford (1882-1955) U.S. educator
 Guion Bluford (born 1942), U.S. astronaut
 Lucile Bluford (1911-2003) U.S. journalist

 Terry Bluford Moore (1912-1995) U.S. baseball player
 Albert Bluford Walker (1926-1992) U.S. baseball player
 Floyd Bluford Henry III (born 1968) U.S. baseball player

with this given name
 Bluford Duck (1858-1895) Old West outlaw
 Bluford Wilson (1841-1924) Solicitor General of the United States of America

Places
 Bluford, Illinois

Other uses
 The Bluford Series, a series of young adult novels

See also
 Bruford (disambiguation)
 Bufford
 Buford (disambiguation)
 Blue (disambiguation)
 Blu (disambiguation)
 Ford (disambiguation)